Porseh Su-ye Olya (also Romanized as Porseh Sū-ye ‘Olyā; also known as Porseh Sū-ye Bālā) is a village in Gholaman Rural District, Raz and Jargalan District, Bojnord County, North Khorasan Province, Iran. At the 2006 census, its population was 764, in 171 families.

References 

Populated places in Bojnord County